Joseph Dixon (April 9, 1828March 3, 1883) was a U.S. Representative from North Carolina for a brief period (1870–1871).

Dixon was born near Farmville, North Carolina, on April 9, 1828. He engaged in agricultural pursuits and also in the mercantile business. Dixon was appointed colonel of the North Carolina State Militia soon after the Civil War and served as a local judge in 1864 and 1865.  He was then elected to serve a two terms as a representative of Greene County in the North Carolina House of Representatives (1868–69, 1869–70).

When Congressman David Heaton of North Carolina's 2nd congressional district died in office, Dixon was elected as a Republican to fill Heaton's vacant seat in the Forty-first Congress. Dixon took his seat December 5, 1870, and served until March 3, 1871; he was not a candidate for renomination in 1870.  He was later appointed as a United States Commissioner of Claims in 1871 and 1872; resumed agricultural pursuits, and was a delegate from Greene County to the State constitutional convention in 1875.  Dixon died near Fountain Hill, Pitt County, N.C., March 3, 1883.

See also
North Carolina General Assembly of 1868–1869

References

Congressional Biography
 

Republican Party members of the United States House of Representatives from North Carolina
North Carolina state court judges
Republican Party members of the North Carolina House of Representatives
1828 births
1883 deaths
19th-century American politicians
19th-century American judges